Volodymyr Petrovych Huba (22 December 1938 – 3 December 2020) was a Ukrainian composer and poet.

Career
Born in Kyiv, he studied music at the Kyiv Conservatory (which is now the National Music Academy of Ukraine) with professors Levko Revutsky, B. Liatoshinskyi and A. Shtoharenko; he graduated with a degree in composition. He has worked as a music teacher, music editor, and a film maker. Films with his music have received awards at international Cinema Festivals. Huba was also awarded the title of the National Artist of Ukraine. He composed the music for some 70 films.

External links
Ukrainian Musicians Directory
Ukrainian Composers Database

Notes

1938 births
2020 deaths
Kyiv Conservatory alumni
Ukrainian classical composers
Musicians from Kyiv
Ukrainian film score composers
Laureates of the Oleksandr Dovzhenko State Prize